Antonio Corma (1911–1971) was a Spanish writer, who contributed to several screenplays during his career.

Selected filmography
 The Path to Crime (1951)

References

Bibliography 
 Eduardo Jakubowicz & Laura Radetich. La historia argentina a través del cine: las "visiones del pasado" (1933–2003). La Crujía, 2006.

External links 
 

1911 births
1971 deaths
Spanish male screenwriters
People from Barcelona
20th-century Spanish screenwriters
20th-century Spanish male writers
Spanish emigrants to Venezuela